Pine Grove or pinegrove may refer to:

Canada

British Columbia 
 Pinegrove, British Columbia

Nova Scotia 
 Pine Grove, Colchester County
 Pine Grove, Lunenburg County

Ontario 
 Pine Grove, a community in Lanark Highlands, Ontario
 Pine Grove, a community in Norfolk County, Ontario
 Pine Grove, a community in North Glengarry, Ontario
 Pine Grove, Regional Municipality of York, Ontario, in southwestern Woodbridge, Ontario
 Pine Grove Public School, Oakville, Ontario
 Pinegrove, a community in McNab/Braeside

India 
 Pinegrove School, in Delhi, India

United States

Alabama 
 Pine Grove, Alabama, in Baldwin County

California 
 Pine Grove, Amador County, California
 Pine Grove, Lake County, California
 Pine Grove, Mendocino County, California
 Pine Grove, Sierra County, California, a ghost town

Illinois 
 Pine Grove, Grundy County, Illinois

Massachusetts 
 Pine Grove Cemetery (Leominster, Massachusetts)
 Pine Grove Cemetery (Lynn, Massachusetts)

Michigan 
 Pine Grove Township, Michigan
 Pine Grove Historical Museum, former estate of Governor Moses Wisner, Pontiac, Michigan

New York 
 Pine Grove, New York, a community in Watson, New York

Nevada 
 Pine Grove, Nevada, a ghost town near Yerington, Nevada

Oregon 
 Pine Grove, Hood River County, Oregon
 Pine Grove, Klamath County, Oregon
 Pine Grove, Wasco County, Oregon

Pennsylvania 
 Pine Grove Iron Works in Cumberland County
 Pine Grove Furnace State Park
 Pine Grove, Schuylkill County, Pennsylvania
 Pine Grove Township, Schuylkill County, Pennsylvania
 Pine Grove Township, Warren County, Pennsylvania
 Pinegrove Township, Venango County, Pennsylvania

Texas 
 Pine Grove, Texas

Virginia 
 Pine Grove, Virginia

West Virginia 
 Pine Grove, Fayette County, West Virginia
 Pine Grove, Marion County, West Virginia
 Pine Grove, Pleasants County, West Virginia
 Pine Grove, Wetzel County, West Virginia

Wisconsin 
 Pine Grove, Brown County, Wisconsin, an unincorporated community
 Pine Grove, Chippewa County, Wisconsin, an unincorporated community
 Pine Grove, Portage County, Wisconsin, a town

Other 
 Pinegrove (band), an American indie rock band

See also